Eurosia puncticosta is a moth of the family Erebidae. It is found on the Bacan Islands.

References

 Natural History Museum Lepidoptera generic names catalog

Nudariina
Moths described in 1911